Aswan Sporting Club, commonly referred to as Aswan, is an Egyptian football club based in Aswan, Egypt. The club currently plays in the Egyptian Premier League, the highest league in the Egyptian football league system. Aswan was founded on 1 January 1930. It's the biggest team in town, and its opponent is the Al Nasr Lel Taa'den.

History
Aswan played a total of eleven seasons in the Egyptian Premier League in its history. The team first appeared in the Premier league in the 1990–91 season. The longest spell the team spent in the Premier league was for only three consecutive seasons (from 1996–97 to 1998–99).

Recent seasons
Statistics in Egyptian Premier League.

Honours

Domestic
Cup
 Egypt Cup
 Runners-up: 1990–91

Current squad

Coaching staff

References

External links
Aswan SC Facebook
Aswan SC Twitter
Aswan SC Instagram

 
Football clubs in Egypt
Sports clubs in Egypt